Tammy Hostetler is an American former competitor in the sport of judo. In 1977, she was recognized by Black Belt magazine as one of the Top 10 female judoka in the United States.

Training 
Tammy benefited from training under Bill Horve at Decatur DoJo in Decatur, Illinois, which allowed her to train with top level talent of Lisa Alstadt and Vickie Daniels.

Career 
In 1975, she earned a gold medal in the U48 women's division at the British Open and the following year she took the silver medal. At the 1976 British Open, Hosteler's record was 5–1 and all of her wins came in the first 49 seconds of the bout. In 1976, she tied with Robin Takemori for a bronze medal at the AAU Women's National Championships in the 110 pound division. In the 1977 U.S. Judo Association Women's Judo Nationals, Tammy was able to earn first place. She earned a bronze medal at the 1977 AAU Senior Women's Championships and another bronze at the first Pan American Judo Union's Women's Championships in the 110 pounds and under division.

In 1976 she was named the female competitor of the year by the U.S. Judo Association. In 1977 she was tenth on the Black Belt '77 Yearbook list of top female judoka, nominated from a survey of top coaches and fellow female fighters. Black Belt also made note of Hostetler's rapid ascent in the sport and that her 1976 recognition for contribution to U.S. Judo was "quite an achievement for a young lady who had been in judo for only three years". She appeared on the cover of American Judo newspaper in May 1977. In international competition, Hostetler had a reputation for refusing to submit when placed in katame-waza holds.

Personal life
Hostetler married in 1977 and moved from Illinois to California.

References

American female judoka
21st-century American women